Loïc Mbe Soh (born 13 June 2001) is a professional footballer who plays as a centre-back for  club Guingamp, on loan from Premier League club Nottingham Forest. Born in Cameroon, he is a former youth international for France.

Club career

Paris Saint-Germain 
An academy graduate of Paris Saint-Germain, Mbe Soh signed his first professional contract in July 2018, which tied him to the club until June 2021. He made his Ligue 1 debut for PSG on 11 May 2019, in a match against Angers. Mbe Soh made his only appearance of the 2019–20 season in a 2–0 league loss against Reims. He played as a right back, before being subbed off for Thomas Meunier in the 59th minute of the match.

On 15 June 2020, Mbe Soh was nominated for the 2020 Golden Boy Award, being one of three PSG players in the 100-player shortlist. On 17 July 2020, he scored a goal in a friendly match against Waasland-Beveren, which ended in a 7–0 victory for PSG.

Nottingham Forest 
On 11 September 2020, Mbe Soh signed for Nottingham Forest, the fee of the deal being undisclosed. He made his debut on 25 September in a 1–0 defeat to Huddersfield Town. He scored his first goal for the club in a 2–1 defeat to Middlesbrough on 20 January 2021.

On 23 January 2023, Mbe Soh joined Ligue 2 side Guingamp on loan for the remainder of the season.

International career 
Mbe Soh is a French youth international, and has captained the France U18 team on various occasions.

Career statistics

Honours
Paris Saint-Germain
Ligue 1: 2018–19, 2019–20
Nottingham Forest
EFL Championship play-offs: 2022

References

External link 

 
 
 

2001 births
Living people
People from Littoral Region (Cameroon)
Association football defenders
French footballers
France youth international footballers
Paris Saint-Germain F.C. players
Championnat National 2 players
Ligue 1 players
French sportspeople of Cameroonian descent
Naturalized citizens of France
Cameroonian emigrants to France
Nottingham Forest F.C. players
French expatriate footballers
Expatriate footballers in England
English Football League players
French expatriate sportspeople in England
Black French sportspeople
En Avant Guingamp players